Geoff Love (born 19 September 1976) is a South African cricketer. He played in 60 first-class and 24 List A matches from 1995 to 2004.

References

External links
 

1976 births
Living people
South African cricketers
Border cricketers
Eastern Province cricketers
Cricketers from Port Elizabeth